Carex vulcani is a species of sedge native to the Azores generally found above  altitude.

References 

vulcani
Endemic flora of the Azores